The List of shipwrecks in 1761 includes some ships sunk, wrecked or otherwise lost during 1761.

January

1 January

15 January

Unknown date

February

12 February

Unknown date

March

1 March

Unknown date

April

11 April

Unknown date

May

4 May

Unknown date

June

15 June

Unknown date

July

1 July

29 July

Unknown date

August

Unknown date

September

3 September

Unknown date

October

2 October

9 October

10 October

27 October

Unknown date

November

4 November

14 November

15 November

16 November

26 November

Unknown date

December

16 December

17 December

28 December

Unknown date

Unknown date

References

1761